The Gweagal (also spelt Gwiyagal) are a clan of the Dharawal people of Aboriginal Australians. Their descendants are traditional custodians of the southern geographic areas of Sydney, New South Wales, Australia.

Country
The Gweagal lived on the area of the southern side of the Georges River and Botany Bay stretching towards the Kurnell Peninsula. Their traditional lands, while not clearly defined, might have extended over much of the area from Cronulla to as far west as Liverpool.

Culture

The Gweagal are the traditional owners of the white clay pits in their territory, which are considered sacred. Historically clay was used to line the base of their canoes so they could light fires, and also as a white body paint, (as witnessed by Captain James Cook). Colour was added to the clay using berries, which produced a brightly coloured paint that was used in ceremonies. It was also eaten as a medicine, an antacid. Geebungs and other local berries were mixed in the clay.

Aboriginal rock shelters
Natural and modified caves or rock shelters were utilised by the Gweagal, including during walkabout – seasonally guided maintenance of land and the "natural gardens" tended by the Aboriginal people. A rock cave collapse at Port Hacking before 1770 claimed many lives of the Gweagal. This cave was later dynamited, revealing many skeletons. In the Royal National Park some of the caves were used as burial sites. In tribal lands and Dreamtime places this cultural practice continues.

There is a large cave located in Peakhurst with its ceiling blackened from smoke. There are caves located around Evatt Park, Lugarno with oyster shells ground into the cave floor. A cave has also been discovered near a Baptist church in Lugarno, and another near Margaret Crescent, Lugarno (now destroyed by development), which was found to contain ochre and a spearhead on the floor of the cave when it was excavated. Another cave exists on Mickey's Point, Padstow, which was named after a local Gweagal man.

The Gweagal decorated their caves and homes with carvings, sculpture, beads, paintings, drawings and etchings using white, red and other coloured earth, clay or charcoal. Symbols such as "water well" with a red ochre hand directed newcomers to wells and water storage. Footprints on a line signalled that there were stairs or steps in the area.
The dwellings had thermal mass which help to keep an even temperature year-round. Rugs, furs and woven mats provided further warmth and comfort. Fire was used to cook, produce materials and keep their shelters warm.

Food source
The territory of the Gweagal had much to offer. The Georges River provided fish and oysters. Various small creeks, most of which are now covered drains, provided fresh water. Men and women fished in canoes or from the shore using barbed spears and fishing lines with hooks that were crafted from crescent-shaped pieces of shell. Waterfowl could be caught in the swamplands near Towra Point and the variety of soils supported a variety of edible and medicinal plants. Birds and their eggs, possums, wallabies and goannas were also a part of their staple diet. The abundant food source meant that these natives were less nomadic than those of Outback Australia.

Middens
Middens have been found all the way along tidal sections of the Georges River where shells, fish bones, and other waste products have been thrown into heaps. These, as well as environmental modifications such as dams, building foundations, large earthen excavations and wells, gives evidence of where the Gweagal established villages for long periods, and are found where oysters, fresh water, and strategic views come together. Middens have been found in Oatley, and Oatley Point was known as a feasting ground. In Lugarno a midden is still existent and may be found in Lime Kiln Bay.

First contact with Europeans
The Gweagal first made visual contact with Cook and other Europeans on the 29 April 1770 in the area which is now known as "Captain Cook's Landing Place", in the Kurnell area of Kamay Botany Bay National Park. It was the first attempt made, on Cook's first voyage, in the Endeavour, to make contact with the Aboriginal people of Australia.

In sailing into the bay they had noted two Gweagal men posted on the rocks, brandishing spears and fighting sticks, and a group of four too intent on fishing to pay much attention to the ship's passage.  Using a telescope as they lay offshore, approximately a kilometre from an encampment consisting of 6–8 gunyahs, Joseph Banks recorded observing an elderly woman come out of the bush, with at first three children in tow, then another three, and light a fire. While busying herself, she looked at the ship at anchor without showing any perplexity. She was joined by the four fishermen, who brought their catch to be cooked.

After an hour and a half, Cook, Banks, Daniel Solander and Tupaia, together with 30 of the crew, made for the beach, only to be threatened by two warriors. They threw some gifts on shore, trying to get over the idea they had come to seek fresh water, but the Gweagal men reacted with hostile diffidence. Cook felt it necessary to encourage a change of attitude by shooting one of the men in the leg with light shot. Unperturbed, the wounded man retrieved a shield from a gunyah before returning. By that time the crew had already beached their boat.

The sailors then proceeded to walk onto the beach and up to an encampment. Both Cook and Banks tried, with great difficulty, to make contact with the local people but without success due to the Gweagal avoiding further contact after the first encounter. They simply went about their daily affairs, seeming to ignore the strangers; they fished from canoes, cooked shellfish on the shore and walked along the beach, but at the same time, watched Cook's crew with caution.

The Gweagal Spears and Shield

In 1770, after returning to England from their voyage in the South Pacific, Cook and Banks brought with them a large collection of flora and fauna, along with cultural artefacts from their most recent venture. The find included a collection of roughly fifty Aboriginal spears that belonged to the Gweagal people. Banks was convinced the spears were abandoned (on the shores of Kurnell) and "thought it no improper measure to take with them all the lances which they could find, somewhere between 40 or 50".

According to Peter Turbet, four of these spears still exist: two bone-tipped three-pronged spears (mooting), one bone-tipped four-pronged spear (calarr) and a shaft with a single hardwood head – the only material reminder of this first contact. Cook gave the spears to his patron, John Montagu, First Lord of the Admiralty and Fourth Earl of Sandwich, who then gave them, to his alma mater Trinity College at the University of Cambridge in England. Archaeologists quote them as being priceless, as the spears are among the few remaining artefacts that can be traced back to Cook's first voyage.  Although the Gweagal Spears remain in the ownership of Trinity College, they are now on display at the Museum of Archaeology and Anthropology at the University of Cambridge.

An Aboriginal shield held by the British Museum had until 2018 been described by the Museum as most likely the bark shield dropped by an Aboriginal warrior (identified in Gweagal tradition as Cooman), who was shot in the leg by Cook's landing party on 29 April 1770. The shield was lent to the National Museum of Australia in Canberra for an exhibition called Encounters: Revealing stories of Aboriginal and Torres Strait Islander objects from the British Museum, from November 2015 to March 2016. Rodney Kelly, sixth-generation descendant of Cooman, went to see the exhibition and immediately started a campaign for the return of the shield, along with the spears in held in Cambridge. Regarded as stolen objects of cultural significance, Kelly said that "the shield is the most significant and potent symbol of imperial aggression – and subsequent Indigenous self-protection and resistance – in existence".

In April 2016, the British Museum offered to display the shield in Australia on a loan, but its permanent return was the only acceptable outcome for the Gweagal people. In 2016 the NSW Legislative Council and the Australian Senate passed motions supporting Kelly's claims. Kelly made several crowdfunded trips to the UK, and included a trip to Germany in 2016. On this trip, Kelly discovered that the Ethnological Museum of Berlin holds another shield also said to be connected to Cook's 1770 visit to Botany Bay.

In November 2016, the British Museum began investigating the provenance of the shield held by them. They held a workshop involving various experts, including curators from both the British and Australian Museums, academics from the Royal Armouries, Cambridge and the Australian National University, and two Aboriginal representatives from La Perouse (the location of Cook's landing site). The participants examined the species of wood, other shields held by the British Museum, museum records and catalogue, and old colonial shipping records. The results of the workshop were reported by Maria Nugent and Gaye Sculthorpe, an Aboriginal curator at the museum, and published in Australian Historical Studies in 2018. The study discussed the origin of the shield, concluding that its history may never be completely settled. Nicholas Thomas, director and curator of the Museum of Archaeology and Anthropology at Cambridge, in his article in the same issue of AHS, also examined the provenance of the shield, concluding that it is not the shield taken from Botany Bay in April 1770. The hole in the shield was "inspected by a firearms specialist and examined for traces of lead", with the conclusion that it was not caused by a bullet.

Historian and archivist Mike Jones of the eScholarship Research Centre of the University of Melbourne and ANU School of History, while not disputing the outcome of the workshop or Thomas' claim, has challenged the use of purely European sources and perspectives to provide the provenance Indigenous artefacts, saying that the shield has become a "cultural touchstone". Sarah Keenan, Leverhulme Fellow and senior lecturer at Birkbeck College Law School in London, said that Indigenous perspectives and methodologies were not used in the workshop, and a different conclusion may have been reached, or other knowledge gained about its significance, had such methods been applied. Thomas himself said that the fact that the shield is not the one represented in the story of the Gweagal Shield does not mean that it should not be repatriated, and its symbolism to all Indigenous Australians should not lose its power. The discussion around the shield is part of a growing movement for the decolonisation of museums in the UK and around the world.

Return of spears
Three of the spears were sent from Cambridge to the National Museum of Australia for the exhibition entitled Endeavour Voyage: The Untold Stories of Cook and the First Australians, from 2 June 2020 to 26 April 2021. The La Perouse Local Aboriginal Land Council and La Perouse Aboriginal Community Alliance worked with the Cambridge museum towards repatriation of the three spears, and on 30 April 2021 it was announced that plans had been made to return the spears to Country.

Notable people 
 Biddy Giles, or Biyarrung, (b.1820-died ca 1890s) was a Gweagal woman who lived throughout her life on traditional Gweagal land, and frequently impressed whites who employed her as a guide by her profound knowledge of the botany and landscape. She was a fluent Dharawal speaker.
 Rodney Kelly (born 1977) is a Gweagal activist campaigning for the return of a shield held by the British Museum, as well as other Indigenous Australian artefacts in museums across Europe and Australia.

See also 
 Eora
 Repatriation (cultural heritage)
 Tharawal
 Australian Aboriginal artefacts

Notes

Citations

Sources

Further reading

 Article by Keenan here.
 (Trove and Worldcat entries)

 
Aboriginal peoples of New South Wales
Artefacts from Africa, Oceania and the Americas in the British Museum
James Cook
Kurnell Peninsula